Farm to Market Road 1464 (FM 1464) is a state highway in the U.S. state of Texas that stays within Fort Bend County. The highway starts from State Highway 99 (SH 99) in Sugar Land and goes north to FM 1093 at Clodine. The four-lane divided highway passes through both rural and suburban areas.

Route description

The location is also a short distance to the north of a railroad underpass. FM 1464 initially starts east but then veers to the north and continues in a northerly direction as a four-lane divided highway for virtually its entire course. Entering an area flanked on both sides by the Stratford Park Village and Orchard Lake Estates subdivisions, FM 1464 comes to a traffic signal at Old Richmond Road and the Macario Garcia Middle School, which is on the east side. In this area, on the left, is Black Hawk Country Club with views of the 8th and 9th holes. The highway turns more to the northeast before passing Stephen F. Austin High School on the east side, then turns north again before coming to a traffic light at West Airport Road. At this point, FM 1464 enters its 2010-designated right-of-way (see History). The pre-2010 right-of-way is known as Clodine Road which is accessible from Denver Miller Road and continues directly north. From West Airport to West Bellfort Road, FM 1464 curves to the north-northwest through an open area. Between West Bellfort and Madden Road, the highway passes through the Aliana subdivision and bends back to the north. From Madden Road to the traffic signal at Beechnut Street the aspect is rural.  

The next north-bound signal after Beechnut is at Clodine Road/Orchard Ridge Lane. Mission West Elementary School is on the east side. Going north, there are traffic lights at Highland Oak Lane/Watering Oaks Lane and Bellaire Boulevard. The traffic signal at West Oaks Village Drive provides access to George H. W. Bush High School on the east side and West Oaks Village subdivision on the west side. After a short distance, FM 1464 crosses under the Westpark Tollway. There are entrance and exit ramps between the tollway and FM 1464. North of the underpass, the highway widens into an eight-lane road for about  before ending at a traffic signal at FM 1093. There is a Kroger store on the east side. This location is a few hundred feet west of the Harris County boundary. The road north of FM 1093, which is not part of FM 1464, is called South Barker Cypress Road.

History
FM 1464 was originally designated on July 22, 1949, to go from U.S. Route 59 (US 59) north  to FM 1093 at Clodine. This was done by a spur connection of length . The old right-of-way was removed from the state highway system.

Major intersections

See also

Notes
Footnotes

Citations

1464
Transportation in Fort Bend County, Texas